WRRZ (880 AM) is a radio station broadcasting a Regional Mexican format. It is licensed to Clinton, North Carolina, United States, and serves the area.  The station is owned by Sanchez Broadcasting. The station must power down at night due to WCBS AM 880 Being on the same AM Frequency

This a Message to WRRZ: This a WRRZ AM. WRRZ AM 880, can no longer broadcasting in Mexican format, sometimes Next Year in February or March 2020 in a mean time with new format called K-Love but thanks for WRRZ staff we would do so over the next 4 months thanks and goodbye.

History
WRRZ signed on April 5, 1947.

In 1966, the station's tower was blown down by high winds that caused widespread damage in North Carolina.

For most of its history, the station played country music and Southern gospel. The station's 1000-watt signal covered 28 counties.
The last day that WRRZ played a county music format was February 14, 2003.

After 25 years at the station, Dave Denton sold WRRZ to Victor and Martha Sanchez, who had bought time on the station since 1990, in a deal effective February 7, 2003. The station is no longer on the air.

References

External links

RRZ
Radio stations established in 1947
1947 establishments in North Carolina
RRZ